Wild edible plants in the geographical region known as Israel and Palestine, like in other countries, have been used to sustain life in periods of dearth and famine, or else simply used as a supplementary food source for additional nourishment and pleasure. The diverse flora of Israel / Palestine offers a wide-range of plants suitable for human consumption, many of which have a long history of usage in the daily cuisines of its native peoples.

In the State of Israel, there is a law (33A) that provides for the preservation of protected natural objects of value. The law includes a list of protected sites and wild plants (flora) and animals (fauna). The law encourages the regulation of the conservation of wild plants in general, and prohibits picking, trading or causing any other damage to protected wild plants.

The local population has, traditionally and in various times of its settlement, made use of these plants, which they gathered for human consumption, whether to be eaten fresh or by steeping them in hot water, or by cooking, or by making use of them as a spice or condiment. All plants herein named are without regulation and can be utilised by the public, unless otherwise noted as protected under Israeli law.

History of foraging
According to Jewish tradition, the history of foraging dates back to the first man, Adam, whom after God had cursed and caused two species of thistle, qōṣ and dardar in Genesis 3:18, to spring-up from the ground, the same plants were given to him as food - had at leisure, along with his bread procured by his own sweat. The idea being that eating the wild plants is more convenient than preparing bread with all the work that precedes it. According to German orientalist, Gustaf Dalman, who researched the cultivated and wild edible plants grown in Palestine, "[as] for all plants, the young growths of spring are used; for the thistles usually only the core and the stem. Otherwise, the principle 'every herb can be eaten' (kull ʻeshb bittākal) is valid." Foraging for edible plants and fungi requires extensive knowledge of flora in order to avoid culling and eating toxic or noxious species. Certain edible plants may have parts that are unfit for human consumption.

Herbs, grasses, fungi and shrubs

Trees 

Although most fruit trees (e.g. grapes, figs, dates, olives, walnuts, plums, almonds, etc.) were cultivated in the country, some of these trees and vines can still be found in abandoned villages and state-owned properties, which make them accessible to all. Still, wild edible fruit trees are also plenteous in Israel / Palestine, of which these are the most common in their geographic regions:

See also 
 List of native plants of Flora Palaestina (A–B)
 List of native plants of Flora Palaestina (C–D)
 List of native plants of Flora Palaestina (E–O)
 List of native plants of Flora Palaestina (P–Z)
 List of forageable plants

References

Bibliography

 , 12 volumes
 
 
 
 
 
   
   (Translation of Gustaf Dalman Work & Customs in Palestine from German)
 
 
 
 
 
 
 
 
 
 
 
 
 
  
 
 
 
 
  (reprinted in 2000)

Further reading 

 (contains a list of forty-one edible plant names but without a botanical determination)

Edible plants
Lists of foods
Vegan cuisine
Vegetarian cuisine
Flora of Palestine (region)
Flora of Israel
Leaf vegetables
Root vegetables
Edible fruits
Edible nuts and seeds
Foraging
Eastern Mediterranean